Tony Hatzis (born 21 August 1986 in Adelaide, South Australia, Australia) is an Australian footballer who plays for West Adelaide SC in the National Premier Leagues South Australia.

Career
In 2005, he signed for Adelaide United in the newly formed Hyundai A-League's inaugural season. He made one substitute appearance, playing 9 minutes against the New Zealand Knights. He was released at the end of the season. He moved to Greece and played at a series of lower league teams before returning to Adelaide in 2010 where he played semi-professionally in the National Premier Leagues South Australian league until he retired to run a tiling business.

References

1986 births
Living people
Soccer players from Adelaide
Australian people of Greek descent
Association football midfielders
Australian soccer players
Australian expatriate soccer players
A-League Men players
FFSA Super League players
Adelaide United FC players
National Premier Leagues players
North Eastern MetroStars SC players